''For the Collective Security Treaty Organization's rapid deployment force see Collective Rapid Reaction Force.

KSOR (90.1 FM) is a National Public Radio member station licensed to Ashland, Oregon. The station is owned by Southern Oregon University, and is an affiliate of Jefferson Public Radio.  It is the flagship of JPR's "Classics & News" service, consisting of news and classical music programming.

KSOR was the original station in what would become JPR, signing on in 1969.

External links
ijpr.org

SOR
Classical music radio stations in the United States
NPR member stations
Southern Oregon University
1969 establishments in Oregon